Kill Me, Deadly is a 2015 American historical fiction neo-noir mystery black comedy film starring Kirsten Vangsness, Lesley-Anne Down and Joe Mantegna.  It is based on a 2009 play by Bill Robens.

Plot
In 1947, hard-boiled detective Charlie Nickels' client is murdered and her priceless diamond stolen. The investigation forces him to do the one thing he swore to never do again: trust a dame.

Cast
Dean Lemont as Charlie Nickels
Kirsten Vangsness as Mona Livingston
Lynn Odell as Ida
Lesley-Anne Down as Lady Clairmont
Raleigh Holmes as Veronica
Nicholas S. Williams as Clive
Joe Mantegna as Bugsy Siegel

References

External links
 

American comedy films
American neo-noir films
American films based on plays
2015 films
2015 comedy films
2010s English-language films
2010s American films